Derrick McDicken (born 4 April 1955) is a Scottish former footballer who played as a central defender.

McDicken is best known for his time with Kilmarnock where he made 437 appearances in major competitions for the Rugby Park club from 1973 to 1985, before rounding off his career with Clyde then Auchinleck Talbot.

References

1955 births
Living people
Kilmarnock F.C. players
Clyde F.C. players
Auchinleck Talbot F.C. players
Scottish Football League players
Association football central defenders
Scottish Football League representative players
Scottish footballers
Scottish Junior Football Association players
Footballers from East Ayrshire